The Prüm is a river in Rhineland-Palatinate, Germany, left tributary of the Sauer.

The Prüm rises in the Schneifel hills, north of the town of Prüm, close to the border with Belgium. It flows southward through Prüm, Waxweiler, Holsthum, and Irrel. The Prüm discharges to the Sauer in Minden, on the border with Luxembourg, three kilometres east of Echternach. The largest tributary of the Prüm is the Nims.

Catchment and tributaries 
The largest tributaries of the Prüm are (l = left bank (dark blue), r = right bank (light blue)):

 Mehlenbach (r), before Watzerath
 Mönbach (r), after Watzerath
 Alfbach (r), near Pronsfeld
 Bierbach (r), after Pronsfeld
 Echtersbach (r), before Brecht
 Enz (r), in Holsthum
 Nims (l), at Irrel

See also
List of rivers of Rhineland-Palatinate

References

Rivers of Rhineland-Palatinate
Rivers of the Eifel
Rivers of Germany